Judith Cutler is a writer of crime fiction whose novels are mostly in series: ten in the series about amateur sleuth and lecturer Sophie Rivers; six about Detective Sergeant Kate Power; six about antique restorer Lina Townend and five about Detective Superintendent Fran Harman. Most are set in the present day, in or around Birmingham.

Biography
Born in 1946 in the Black Country, Cutler later moved to the Birmingham suburb of Harborne.

She started writing while at Oldbury Grammar School, winning the Critical Quarterly Short Story prize. She read English at university, but wrote nothing more until in her thirties. While suffering from chickenpox, she started her first, unpublished, novel. Two further unpublished works followed.

She taught English at a Further Education College in Birmingham, but quit after the publication of her first novel, and moved to the suburb of Kings Heath.

For many years she was a trustee of the City of Birmingham Symphony Orchestra's Benevolent Fund and on the Committee of Birmingham Chamber Music Society. Her partner is Keith Miles.

Bibliography

Novels

Sophie Rivers

Dying Fall (1995)
Dying On Principle (1996)
Dying To Write (1997)
Dying For Millions (1997)
Dying For Power (1998)
Dying To Score (1999)
Dying By Degrees (2000)
Dying By The Book (2001)
Dying in Discord (2002)
Dying to Deceive 2003

Kate Power

Power On Her Own (1998)
Staying Power (1999)
Power Games (2000)
Will Power (2001)
Hidden Power (2002)
Power Shift  (2003)

Lina Townend
Drawing the Line (2004)
Silver Guilt (2010)
Ring Of Guilt (2010)
Guilty Pleasures (2011)
Guilt Trip (2012)
Guilt Edged (2013)
Guilty as Sin (2015)

Josie Welford
The Food Detective (2005)
Chinese Takeout (2006)

Fran Harman
Life Sentence (2005)
Cold Pursuit (2007)
Still Waters (2009)
Burying the Past (2012)
Double Fault (2013)

Tobias Campion
Keeper of Secrets (2007)
Shadow of the Past (2008)

Jodie Welsh
Death in Elysium (2014)

Non-series romances

Coming Alive (2000)
Head Over Heels (2001)

Non-series mysteries
Scar Tissue (2005) - protagonist Caffy Tyler
Staging Death (2009) - protagonist Vena Burford

Short stories
Cutler has also written several successful short stories, for Radio 4, Bella magazine and others.

External links
Cutler's website

1946 births
Living people
English crime writers
English women novelists
20th-century English novelists
20th-century English women writers
21st-century English novelists
21st-century English women writers
People from the Black Country